Big Idea Productions, LLC (formerly known as Big Idea Productions, Inc., Big Idea, Inc. and Big Idea Entertainment, LLC; also simply as Big Idea) is an American Christian animation company, best known for its computer-animated VeggieTales series of Christian-themed home videos.

Founded in February 1989 as GRAFx Studios by Phil Vischer, the company was renamed as Big Idea Productions in August 1993 and it released its first direct-to-video VeggieTales program in December. In 2002, Big Idea adapted the Biblical story of Jonah for its first theatrical feature film, Jonah: A VeggieTales Movie, which was co-produced with FHE Pictures. Its second theatrical film, The Pirates Who Don't Do Anything: A VeggieTales Movie, was co-produced with Starz Animation and released in 2008.

From 1999 to 2004, headquarters of Big Idea Entertainment was in Lombard, Illinois, a suburb outside of Chicago. After Big Idea Entertainment declared bankruptcy in 2003 and the company was sold to Classic Media, headquarters was moved in 2004 to Franklin, Tennessee, a suburb outside of Nashville. In 2012, DreamWorks Animation purchased Classic Media. In 2013, DreamWorks began to oversee productions of Big Idea Entertainment and launched the Netflix series VeggieTales in the House.  After production of  VeggieTales in the House's sequel series entitled VeggieTales in the City wrapped in 2017, DreamWorks sold the Franklin headquarters to Kingdom Story Company. Big Idea continues to operate as an in-name-only company and a unit of DreamWorks Animation; with Universal Pictures handling distribution and licensing rights for the company. 

Bob the Tomato and Larry the Cucumber, characters from VeggieTales, served as the company's mascots.

History
Big Idea was founded in February 1989 under the name GRAFx Studios by Phil Vischer to create graphics in television commercials. In 1991, Vischer created a 12-second short film called Mr. Cuke's Screen Test. This short inspired him and Mike Nawrocki to create VeggieTales, with Nawrocki coming up with the name. Vischer thought the name "GRAFx" no longer suited a company about to create children's videos, so he renamed it as Big Idea Productions, Inc. on August 6, 1993. The company released its first video, Where's God When I'm S-Scared? in December of the same year.

Rapidly running out of office space, Big Idea relocated to the Chicago suburbs in 1997 with the purchase of the DuPage Theater in Lombard, Illinois. However, renovation delays, unforeseen building conditions, and lengthy zoning battles resulted. In the interim, the company was guided by Lombard City officials to rent space at the Yorktown Center, a local mall.

In a co-production with FHE Pictures, Big Idea released its first theatrical feature film, Jonah: A VeggieTales Movie on October 4, 2002.

On September 2, 2003, Big Idea declared bankruptcy after encountering management and financial issues and a lawsuit by HIT Entertainment in 2001. By the end of the year, it was auctioned off to Classic Media for $19.3 million. After its purchase, the company relocated to Nashville in 2004.

Big Idea partnered with Toronto-based Starz Animation to produce its second theatrical feature film, The Pirates Who Don't Do Anything: A VeggieTales Movie, which was released on January 11, 2008 by Universal Pictures.

In April 2009, Entertainment Rights fell into voluntary administration and sold its UK- and US-based subsidiaries, including Big Idea and its parent company, Classic Media, to Boomerang Media. As of 2011 Big Idea, Inc. has been repackaged officially as Big Idea Entertainment, LLC. In July 2012, Big Idea's parent company, Classic Media, was acquired by DreamWorks Animation and renamed DreamWorks Classics.

On April 28, 2016, NBCUniversal announced that it would be acquiring DreamWorks Animation for $3.8 billion. The sale was completed on August 22, 2016.

On July 3, 2018, Vischer confirmed that Big Idea's offices in Franklin were shut down. While marketing employees continued to work for Big Idea during this time, DreamWorks sold the Franklin, Tennessee studio in late 2017.

In 2018, NBCUniversal licensed the properties of the studio to The Trinity Broadcasting Network. They launched the production of a new series entitled The VeggieTales Show in 2019 through a collaboration between NBCUniversal and Trilogy Animation Group. Vischer confirmed on Twitter that he and Nawrocki were both returning to work as head writers for the new series. The company returned to its original name Big Idea Productions, LLC. In late June 2021, Phil Vischer, Mike Nawrocki, Lisa Vischer, and Kurt Heinecke were all laid off due to pay disputes, consequently bringing the end of Big Idea Entertainment following the completion of The VeggieTales Show’s production.

VeggieTales history

VeggieTales is a series of children's computer animated films featuring anthropomorphic vegetables and conveying moral themes based on Christianity, spliced with joking references to pop culture and current events. VeggieTales was created by Phil Vischer and Mike Nawrocki, who also provide many of the voices. VeggieTales has also been released as books, games, and many other branded items such as toys and clothing. Additionally, the series has been adapted for television broadcast on Qubo (where it aired from September 9, 2006, to September 5, 2009) and on Netflix where DreamWorks Animation Television produced two series, VeggieTales in the House (which ran from November 26, 2014 to September 23, 2016) and VeggieTales in the City (which ran from February 24 to September 15, 2017).

Filmography

Direct-to-video/television series

Television specials

Feature films

References

External links
Official site
What Happened To Big Idea? article by Phil Vischer

 
2003 mergers and acquisitions
American animation studios
American companies established in 1989
Christian film production companies
Christian mass media companies
Christian animation
Companies based in Nashville, Tennessee
DreamWorks Classics
Entertainment companies established in 1989
Lombard, Illinois
Mass media companies established in 1989
Tustin, California
VeggieTales
Universal Pictures subsidiaries
NBCUniversal